HN3 may refer to:
Tris(2-chloroethyl)amine or HN3, a nitrogen mustard
Hydrazoic acid or HN3